Boris Pavić (born 4 December 1973) is a Croatian football manager and former player.

Managerial career
He landed his first managerial job at OSK and was named manager of Hrvace in June 2014. He then joined former club Čelik Zenica in January 2015 and took charge of Junak Sinj in January 2016. In June 2016 he was appointed manager of Vitez, replacing Branko Karačić, only to be dismissed in September that year.

In March 2017, Pavić returned to take charge again of Bosnian side Čelik, after Nedim Jusufbegović resigned due to poor results. In September 2017 he succeeded Elvedin Beganović at Rudar Kakanj.

He was appointed manager of Solin in December 2018. He previously coached Široki Brijeg, but left in August 2018 after  months in the role. He then managed Sloga Mravince from October 2020 until February 2022, when he was replaced by former Solin manager Ivan Matić. He then took charge at Croatia Zmijavci, succeeding Jure Srzic in March 2022, followed by a new position as manager at Zagora Unešić in July 2022.

References

External links
 

1973 births
Living people
People from Sinj
Association football defenders
Croatian footballers
NK Inter Zaprešić players
NK Junak Sinj players
HNK Rijeka players
NK Varaždin players
HNK Segesta players
FC Chernomorets Novorossiysk players
NK Čelik Zenica players
Sydney United 58 FC players
NK Žepče players
NK Croatia Sesvete players
HNK Šibenik players
RNK Split players
NK Primorac 1929 players
NK Hrvace players
Croatian Football League players
First Football League (Croatia) players
Russian Premier League players
Premier League of Bosnia and Herzegovina players
National Soccer League (Australia) players
Croatian expatriate footballers
Expatriate footballers in Russia
Croatian expatriate sportspeople in Russia
Expatriate footballers in Bosnia and Herzegovina
Croatian expatriate sportspeople in Bosnia and Herzegovina
Expatriate soccer players in Australia
Croatian expatriate sportspeople in Australia
Croatian football managers
NK Čelik Zenica managers
NK Vitez managers
FK Rudar Kakanj managers
NK Široki Brijeg managers
NK Solin managers
Premier League of Bosnia and Herzegovina managers
Croatian expatriate football managers
Expatriate football managers in Bosnia and Herzegovina